Patrick Galbraith and Jonathan Stark were the defending champions, but Stark did not participate this year.  Galbraith partnered Ellis Ferreira, losing in the final.

Marc-Kevin Goellner and Richey Reneberg won the title, defeating Ferreira and Galbraith 6–3, 3–6, 7–6 in the final.

Seeds

  Ellis Ferreira /  Patrick Galbraith (final)
  Jonas Björkman /  Nicklas Kulti (semifinals)
  Joshua Eagle /  Patrick Rafter (semifinals)
  Pavel Vízner /  Fernon Wibier (first round)

Draw

Draw

External links
Draw

1997 Stockholm Open
1997 ATP Tour